Intrauterine device (IUD) with copper(shortly called CU-T), also known as intrauterine coil or copper coil, is a type of intrauterine device which contains copper. It is used for birth control and emergency contraception within five days of unprotected sex. It is one of the most effective forms of birth control with a one-year failure rate around 0.7%. The device is placed in the uterus and lasts up to twelve years. It may be used by women of all ages regardless of whether or not they have had children. Following removal, fertility quickly returns.

Side effects may be heavy menstrual periods, and/or rarely the device may come out. It is less recommended for people at high risk of sexually transmitted infections as it may increase the risk of pelvic inflammatory disease in the first three weeks after insertion. It is recommended for people who don't tolerate or hardly tolerate hormonal contraceptives. If a woman becomes pregnant with an IUD in place removal is recommended. Very rarely, uterine perforation may occur during insertion if not done properly. The copper IUD is a type of long-acting reversible birth control. It primarily works by killing the sperm.

The copper IUD came into medical use in the 1970s. It is on the World Health Organization's List of Essential Medicines. They are used by more than 170 million women globally.

Medical uses 
Copper IUDs are a form of long-acting reversible contraception and are one of the most effective forms of birth control available. The type of frame and amount of copper can affect the effectiveness of different copper IUD models. The failure rates for different models vary between 0.1 and 2.2% after 1 year of use. The T-shaped models with a surface area of 380 mm² of copper have the lowest failure rates. The TCu 380A (ParaGard) has a one-year failure rate of 0.8% and a cumulative 12-year failure rate of 2.2%. Over 12 years of use, the models with less surface area of copper have higher failure rates. The TCu 220A has a 12-year failure rate of 5.8%. The frameless GyneFix has a failure rate of less than 1% per year. Worldwide, older IUD models with lower effectiveness rates are no longer produced.

Unlike other forms of reversible contraception, the typical use failure rate and the perfect use failure rate for the copper IUDs are the same because the IUD does not depend on user action. A 2008 review of the available T-shaped copper IUDs recommended that the TCu 380A and the TCu 280S be used as the first choice for copper IUDs because those two models have the lowest failure rates and the longest lifespans. The effectiveness of the copper IUD (failure rate of 0.8%) is comparable to tubal sterilization (failure rate of 0.5%) for the first year. However, the effects of the copper IUD are reversible, which can be viewed as either an advantage or a disadvantage, depending on a person's goals for contraception.

Emergency contraception 
It was first discovered in 1976 that the copper IUD could be used as a form of emergency contraception (EC). The copper IUD is the most effective form of emergency contraception. It is more effective than the hormonal EC pills currently available. The pregnancy rate among those using the copper IUD for EC is 0.09%. It can be used for EC up to five days after the act of unprotected sex and does not decrease in effectiveness during the five days. An additional advantage of using the copper IUD for emergency contraception is that it can be used as a form of birth control for 10–12 years after insertion.

Removal and return to fertility 
Removal of the copper IUD should also be performed by a qualified medical practitioner. Fertility has been shown to return to previous levels quickly after removal of the device. One study found that the median amount of time from removal to planned pregnancy was three months for those women using the TCu 380Ag.

Side effects 
Expulsion: Sometimes, the copper IUD can be spontaneously expelled from the uterus. Expulsion rates can range from 2.2% to 11.4% of users from the first year to the 10th year. The TCu380A may have lower rates of expulsion than other models. Unusual vaginal discharge, cramping or pain, spotting between periods, postcoital (after sex) spotting, dyspareunia, or the absence or lengthening of the strings can be signs of a possible expulsion. If expulsion occurs, the woman is not protected against pregnancy. If an IUD with copper is inserted after an expulsion has occurred, the risk of re-expulsion has been estimated in one study to be approximately one third of cases after one year. Magnetic resonance imaging (MRI) may cause dislocation of a copper IUD, and it is therefore recommended to check the location of the IUD both before and after MRI.

Perforation: Very rarely, the IUD can move through the wall of the uterus. Risk of perforation is mostly determined by the skill of the practitioner performing the insertion. For experienced medical practitioners, the risk of perforation is 1 per 1,000 insertions or less. It is recommended to consult an obstetrician/gynecologist, who has the equipment to properly insert the IUD and check that it does not move during the months following insertion.

Infection: The insertion of a copper IUD poses a transient risk of pelvic inflammatory disease (PID) in the first 21 days after insertion. However, it is a small risk and is attributable to preexisting gonorrhea or chlamydia infection at the time of insertion, and not to the IUD itself. Proper infection prevention procedures have little or no effect on the course of gonorrhea or chlamydia infections but are important in helping protect both clients and providers from infection in general. Such infection prevention practices include washing hands and then putting on gloves, cleaning the cervix and vagina, making minimal contact with non-sterile surfaces (using a no-touch insertion technique), and, after the procedure, washing hands again and then processing instruments. The device itself carries no increased risk of PID beyond the time of insertion.

Cramping: Some women can feel cramping during the IUD insertion process and immediately after as a result of cervix dilation during insertion. Taking NSAIDs before the procedure often reduces discomfort, as the use of a local anaesthetic. Misoprostol 6 to 12 hrs before insertion can help with cervical dilation. Some women may have cramps for 1 to 2 weeks following insertion.

Heavier periods: The copper IUD may increase the amount of blood flow during a woman's menstrual periods. On average, menstrual blood loss may increase by 20–50% after insertion of a copper-T IUD; This symptom may clear up for some women after 3 to 6 months.

Irregular bleeding and spotting: For some women, the copper IUD may cause spotting between periods during the first 3 to 6 months after insertion.

Pregnancy: Although rare, if pregnancy does occur with the copper IUD in place there can be side effects. The risk of ectopic pregnancy to a woman using an IUD is lower than the risk of ectopic pregnancy to a woman using no form of birth control. However, of pregnancies that do occur during IUD use, a higher than expected percentage (3–4%) are ectopic. If pregnancy occurs with the IUD in place there is a higher risk of miscarriage or early delivery. If this occurs and the IUD strings are visible, the IUD should be removed immediately by a clinician. Although the Dalkon Shield IUD was associated with septic abortions (infections associated with miscarriage), other brands of IUD are not. IUDs are also not associated with birth defects.

Some barrier contraceptives protect against STIs. Hormonal contraceptives reduce the risk of developing pelvic inflammatory disease (PID), a serious complication of certain STIs. IUDs, by contrast, do not protect against STIs or PID.

Copper Toxicity: There exists anecdotal evidence linking copper IUDs to cases of copper toxicity.

Contraindications 
A category 3 condition indicates conditions where the theoretical or proven risks usually outweigh the advantages of inserting a copper IUD. A category 4 condition indicates conditions that represent an unacceptable health risk if a copper IUD is inserted.

Women should not use a copper IUD if they:

(Category 4)
Are pregnant or think they may be pregnant
Have certain uterine abnormalities
Have malignant gestational trophoblastic disease
Have or may have an STI
Have or may have had a pelvic infection within the past three months
Have pelvic tuberculosis
Have unexplained abnormal vaginal bleeding
Have untreated cervical cancer
Have uterine cancer
Having a septic pregnancy or abortion

(Category 3)
Are postpartum between 48 hours and 4 weeks (increased IUD expulsion rate with delayed postpartum insertion). The CDC and WHO criteria differ in their recommendation for women postpartum between 48 hours and 4 weeks. The CDC does not list this as a contraindication.
Have AIDS (unless clinically well on anti-retroviral therapy)
Have benign gestational trophoblastic disease
Have ovarian cancer
Have very high individual likelihood of exposure to gonorrhea or chlamydial STIs

A full list of contraindications can be found in the World Health Organization (WHO) Medical Eligibility Criteria for Contraceptive Use and the Centers for Disease Control and Prevention (CDC) United States Medical Eligibility Criteria for Contraceptive Use.

Being a nulliparous women (women who have never given birth) is not a contraindication for IUD use. IUDs are safe and acceptable even in young nulliparous women. The same is likely the case for virgin women, unless there is a microperforate hymen that obstructs any insertion of the IUD.

Device description 
There are a number of models of copper IUDs available around the world. Most copper devices consist of a plastic core that is wrapped in a copper wire. Many of the devices have a T-shape similar to the hormonal IUD. However, there are "frameless" copper IUDs available as well. ParaGard is the only model currently available in the United States. At least three copper IUD models are available in Canada, two of which are slimmer T-shape versions used for women who have not had children. Early copper IUDs had copper around only the vertical stem, but more recent models have copper sleeves wrapped around the horizontal arms as well, increasing effectiveness.

Some newer models also contain a silver core instead of a plastic core to delay copper fragmentation as well as increase the lifespan of the device. The lifespan of the devices range from 3 years to 10 years; however, some studies have demonstrated that the TCu 380A may be effective through 12 years.

Insertion 
The copper IUD must be inserted by a qualified medical practitioner. It is recommended to consult an obstetrician/gynecologist, who has the equipment to properly insert the IUD and check that it does not move during the months following insertion. A copper IUD can be inserted at any phase of the menstrual cycle, but the optimal time is right after the menstrual period when the cervix is softest and the woman is least likely to be pregnant. The insertion process generally takes five minutes or less. The procedure can cause cramping or be painful for some women.
Before placement of an IUD, a medical history and physical examination by a medical professional is useful to check for any contraindications or concerns. It is also recommended by some clinicians that patients be tested for gonorrhea and chlamydia, as these two infections increase the risk of contracting pelvic inflammatory disease shortly after insertion.

Immediately prior to insertion, the clinician will perform a pelvic exam to determine the position of the uterus.
After the pelvic exam, the vagina is held open with a speculum. A tenaculum is used to steady the cervix and uterus. Uterine sounding may be used to measure the length and direction of the cervical canal and uterus in order to decrease the risk of uterine perforation. The IUD is placed using a narrow tube, which is inserted through the cervix into the uterus. Short monofilament plastic/nylon strings hang down from the uterus into the vagina. The clinician will trim the threads so that they only protrude 3 to 4 cm out of the cervix and remain in the upper vagina. The strings allow the patient or clinician to periodically check to ensure the IUD is still in place and to enable easy removal of the device.

The copper IUD can be inserted at any time in a woman's menstrual cycle as long as the woman is not pregnant. An IUD can also be inserted immediately postpartum and post-abortion as long as no infection has occurred. Breastfeeding is not a contraindication for the use of the copper IUD. The IUD can be inserted in women with HIV or AIDS as it does not increase the risk of transmission.
Although previously not recommended for nulliparous women (women who have not had children), the IUD is now recommended for most women who are past menarche (their first period), including adolescents.

After the insertion is finished, normal activities such as sex, exercise, and swimming can be performed as soon as it feels comfortable. Strenuous physical activity does not affect the position of the IUD.

Types 

Many different types of copper IUDs are currently manufactured worldwide, but availability varies by country. In the United States, only one type of copper IUD is approved for use, while in the United Kingdom, over ten varieties are available. One company, Mona Lisa N.V., offers generic versions of many existing IUDs.

Frameless IUDs 
The frameless IUD eliminates the use of the frame that gives conventional IUDs their signature T-shape. This change in design was made to reduce discomfort and expulsion associated with prior IUDs; without a solid frame, the frameless IUD should mold to the shape of the uterus. It may reduce expulsion and discontinuation rates compared to framed copper IUDs.

Gynefix is the only frameless IUD brand currently available.  It consists of hollow copper tubes on a polypropylene thread.  It is inserted through the cervix with a special applicator that sutures the thread to the fundus (top) of the uterus; the thread is then cut with a tail hanging outside of the cervix, similar to frame IUDs.  When this tail is pulled, the suture comes undone and the device can be removed.  This requires more force than removing a T-shaped IUD and results in comparable discomfort during removal. Gynefix is not approved for use in the United States.

Mechanism of action 

The copper IUD's primary mechanism of action is to prevent fertilization. Copper acts as a spermicide within the uterus. The presence of copper increases the levels of copper ions, prostaglandins, and white blood cells within the uterine and tubal fluids.

Although not a primary mechanism of action, some experts in human reproduction believe there is sufficient evidence to suggest that IUDs with copper can disrupt implantation, especially when used for emergency contraception. Despite this, there has been no definitive evidence that IUD users have higher rates of embryonic loss than women not using contraception. Therefore, the copper IUD is considered to be a true contraceptive and not an abortifacient.

Usage 
Globally, the IUD is the most widely used method of reversible birth control. The most recent data indicates that there are 169 million IUD users around the world. This includes both the nonhormonal and hormonal IUDs. IUDs are most popular in Asia, where the prevalence is almost 30%. In Africa and Europe, the prevalence is around 20%. As of 2009, levels of IUD use in the United States are estimated to be 5.5%. Data in the United States does not distinguish between hormonal and non-hormonal IUDs. In Europe, copper IUD prevalence ranges from under 5% in the United Kingdom to over 10% in Denmark in 2006.

History 
According to popular legend, Arab traders inserted small stones into the uteruses of their camels to prevent pregnancy during long desert treks. The story was originally a tall tale to entertain delegates at a scientific conference on family planning; although it was later repeated as truth, it has no known historical basis.

Precursors to IUDs were first marketed in 1902. Developed from stem pessaries (where the stem held the pessary in place over the cervix), the 'stem' on these devices actually extended into the uterus itself. Because they occupied both the vagina and the uterus, this type of stem pessary was also known as an intrauterine device.  The use of intrauterine devices was associated with high rates of infection; for this reason, they were condemned by the medical community.

The first intrauterine device (contained entirely in the uterus) was described in a German publication in 1909, although the author appears to have never marketed his product.

In 1929, Ernst Gräfenberg of Germany published a report on an IUD made of silk sutures. He had found a 3% pregnancy rate among 1,100 women using his ring. In 1930, Gräfenberg reported a lower pregnancy rate of 1.6% among 600 women using an improved ring wrapped in silver wire. Unbeknownst to Gräfenberg, the silver wire was contaminated with 26% copper. Copper's role in increasing IUD efficacy would not be recognized until nearly 40 years later.

In 1934, Japanese physician Tenrei Ota developed a variation of Gräfenberg's ring that contained a supportive structure in the center. The addition of this central disc lowered the IUD's expulsion rate. These devices still had high rates of infection, and their use and development were further stifled by World War II politics: contraception was forbidden in both Nazi Germany and Axis-allied Japan. The Allies did not learn of the work by Gräfenberg and Ota until well after the war ended.

The first plastic IUD, the Margulies Coil or Margulies Spiral, was introduced in 1958. This device was somewhat large, causing discomfort to a large proportion of women users, and had a hard plastic tail, causing discomfort to their male partners.  The modern colloquialism "coil" is based on the coil-shaped design of early IUDs.

The Lippes Loop, a slightly smaller device with a monofilament tail, was introduced in 1962 and gained in popularity over the Margulies device.

The stainless steel single-ring IUD was developed in the 1970s and widely used in China because of low manufacturing costs. The Chinese government banned production of steel IUDs in 1993 due to high failure rates (up to 10% per year).

Howard Tatum, in the US, conceived the plastic T-shaped IUD in 1968. Shortly thereafter Jaime Zipper, in Chile, introduced the idea of adding copper to the devices to improve their contraceptive effectiveness. It was found that copper-containing devices could be made in smaller sizes without compromising effectiveness, resulting in fewer side effects such as pain and bleeding. T-shaped devices had lower rates of expulsion due to their greater similarity to the shape of the uterus.

The poorly designed Dalkon Shield plastic IUD (which had a multifilament tail) was manufactured by the A. H. Robins Company and sold by Robins in the United States for three and a half years from January 1971 through June 1974, before sales were suspended by Robins on June 28, 1974, at the request of the FDA because of safety concerns following reports of 110 septic spontaneous abortions in women with the Dalkon Shield in place, seven of whom had died.
Robins stopped international sales of the Dalkon Shield in April 1975.

Tatum developed many different models of the copper IUD. He created the TCu220 C, which had copper collars as opposed to a copper filament, which prevented metal loss and increased the lifespan of the device.  Second-generation copper-T IUDs were also introduced in the 1970s. These devices had higher surface areas of copper, and for the first time consistently achieved effectiveness rates of greater than 99%. The last model Tatum developed was the TCu380A, the model that is most recommended today. In addition to T-shaped IUDs, there are also U-shaped IUDs (such as the Multiload) and 7-shaped Gravigard Copper 7 (with a mini version for nulliparous women introduced in the 1980s). More recently, a frameless IUD called Gynefix was introduced.

Brands 
The ParaGard T-380A is an IUD with copper, manufactured and marketed in the United States by The Cooper Companies. It is the only copper-containing intrauterine device approved for use in the U.S. (three hormonal uterine devices, Mirena, Skyla and Liletta are also approved). The ParaGard consists of a T-shaped polyethylene frame wound with copper wire, along with two monofilament threads to aid in the removal of the IUD.

The ParaGard T 380A was developed in the 1970s by the Population Council and Finishing Enterprises Inc. (FEI). The Population Council's ParaGard new drug application (NDA) was approved by the U.S. Food and Drug Administration (FDA) and FEI began manufacturing it for distribution outside the United States in 1984. GynoPharma (originally GynoMed) began marketing it in the U.S. in May 1988. On August 2, 1995, Ortho-McNeil acquired GynoPharma and began marketing ParaGard in the U.S. On January 1, 2004, FEI Women's Health acquired the patent from the Population Council and U.S. marketing rights from Ortho-McNeil. On November 10, 2005, Duramed Pharmaceuticals, a subsidiary of Barr Pharmaceuticals, acquired FEI Women's Health and ParaGard.  On July 18, 2008, it was announced that Teva Pharmaceutical Industries Ltd. would acquire Barr Pharmaceuticals.

On November 1, 2017, The Cooper Companies acquired Paragard from Teva Pharmaceutical Industries for approximately $1.1 billion.

The original FDA approval of ParaGard in 1984 was for 4 years continuous use, this was later extended to 6 years in 1989, then 8 years in 1991, then 10 years in 1994.  (ATC code )

References

External links 
 Association of Reproductive Health Professionals' Clinical Proceedings: New Developments in Intrauterine Contraception

 
World Health Organization essential medicines
Wikipedia medicine articles ready to translate